Willie Norwood may refer to:

Willie Norwood, gospel singer
Willie Norwood (basketball), basketball player
Willie Norwood (baseball), baseball player